The 2020 Toyota 200 presented by Crosley Brands was the 17th stock car race of the 2020 ARCA Menards Series season and the 25th iteration of the event. The race was held on Saturday, September 19, 2020, in Winchester, Indiana at Winchester Speedway, a 1⁄2 mile (0.80 km) permanent, oval-shaped, high-banked racetrack. The race took the scheduled 200 laps to complete. At race's end, Ty Gibbs of Joe Gibbs Racing would dominate the race, winning his seventh career ARCA Menards Series win and his fifth of the season. To fill out the podium, Michael Self of Venturini Motorsports and Bret Holmes of Bret Holmes Racing would finish second and third, respectively.

Background 
Winchester Speedway is a half-mile paved oval motor racetrack in White River Township, Randolph County, just outside Winchester, Indiana, approximately 90 miles (145 km) northeast of Indianapolis. It seats 4000 spectators. It is also known as the "World's Fastest 1/2 mile".

The track's 37 degree banking is one of the steepest in motorsports, and the highest-banked active racetrack in the country. Notable drivers that raced at Winchester include Rusty Wallace, Mark Martin, Jeff Gordon, Tony Stewart, Ryan Newman, Sarah Fisher and Chase Briscoe.

Entry list

Practice 
Practice was held on Saturday, September 19.

Qualifying 
Qualifying was held on Saturday, September 19, at 1:30 PM EST. Each driver would have two laps to set a fastest time; the fastest of the two would count as their official qualifying lap.

Full qualifying results

Race results

References 

2020 ARCA Menards Series
September 2020 sports events in the United States
2020 in sports in Indiana